Watkowice Małe  is a village in the administrative district of Gmina Ryjewo, within Kwidzyn County, Pomeranian Voivodeship, in northern Poland. 

The village has a population of 220.

Notable residents
 Carl Julius Meyer von Klinggräff (1809–1879), German botanist
 Hugo Erich Meyer von Klinggräff (1820-1902), German botanist

References

Villages in Kwidzyn County